ATP-dependent RNA helicase DDX24 is an enzyme that in humans is encoded by the DDX24 gene.

DEAD box proteins, characterized by the conserved motif Asp-Glu-Ala-Asp (DEAD), are putative RNA helicases. They are implicated in a number of cellular processes involving alteration of RNA secondary structure such as translation initiation, nuclear and mitochondrial RNA splicing, and ribosome and spliceosome assembly. Based on their distribution patterns, some members of this family are believed to be involved in embryogenesis, spermatogenesis, and cellular growth and division. This gene encodes a DEAD box protein, which shows little similarity to any of the other known human DEAD box proteins, but shows a high similarity to mouse Ddx24 at the amino acid level.

References

Further reading